Swarupchand Mohanlal Shah (December 30, 1905 – April 21, 1996) was a Distinguished Professor of Mathematics at the University of Kentucky. He received his Ph.D. from University of London in 1942, advised by Edward Titchmarsh who was a Ph.D. student of G. H. Hardy. He was a fellow of the Royal Society of Edinburgh.

Selected publications
 "Advanced differential equations with piecewise constant argument deviations" ►hindawi.com [PDF], SM Shah, J Wiener, International Journal of Mathematics and Mathematical …, 1983, hindawi.com
 "Univalent functions with univalent derivatives", SM Shah, SY Trimble, Bulletin of the American Mathematical Society, 1969, ams.org
 "Trigonometric series with quasi-monotone coefficients", SM Shah, Proceedings of the American Mathematical Society, 1962, jstor.org

Notes

1905 births
1996 deaths
University of Kentucky faculty
Alumni of the University of London
Indian expatriates in the United Kingdom
Indian emigrants to the United States